The Creative Flight Aerocat is a Canadian mid-wing, all composite, four passenger experimental aircraft that can be configured for amphibious float operations. Under development since 1998, the aircraft is intended to be supplied in kit form by Creative Flight of Haliburton, Ontario, for amateur construction. The company has since been renamed Auriga Design.

Design and development
Development started in 1998 on the MPA Aerocat. In 2002, the vehicle was renamed the Creative Flight Aerocat.

The all composite aircraft features a distinctive gull-wing design with pods that floats can attach to. A twin engine variant is powered by two Jabiru 3300 engines. In both the case of the single and twin engined versions, the engines are mounted in pusher configuration on a composite arch behind the cockpit.

Operational history
The single engine prototype flew in 2001, then was retrofitted for twin engine operations and flown in 2002. Shortly afterward the aircraft was test flown with floats.

In 2003, the prototype was flown to the EAA AirVenture Oshkosh airshow and displayed.

As of August 2019 the prototype, C-GYCC, remained the sole example flying.

Variants
SR
Single engine version with retractable gear, powered by a Crossflow CF4-20THO  engine.
SRX
Single engine version with retractable gear and floats, powered by a Crossflow CF4-20THO  engine or one Pratt & Whitney Canada PT6A-21 turboprop producing 
TR
Twin engine version with retractable gear, powered by two Jabiru 3300  engines
TRX
Twin engine version with retractable gear and floats, powered by two Jabiru 3300  engines

Specifications (Aerocat SR)

References

External links

Homebuilt aircraft